George Charles Cherry  (26 January 1822 – 12 June 1887) was an English first-class cricketer and barrister.

The son of the politician George Henry Cherry, he was born in January 1822 at Kintbury, Berkshire. He was educated at Harrow School, before going up to Christ Church, Oxford. While studying at Oxford, he played first-class cricket for Oxford University, making his debut against the Marylebone Cricket Club at Oxford in 1841. He made eight further first-class appearances for Oxford, with his final appearance coming in 1844. In his nine first-class matches, he scored 122 runs at an average of 7.17, with a high score of 20.

A student of the Inner Temple, he was called to the bar in May 1848. He was the High Sheriff of Berkshire in 1871 and served as a justice of the peace. Cherry was the chairman of the Berkshire quarter sessions from 1885–87. He died at Denford House at Kintbury in June 1887. His grandfather was George Frederick Cherry, a political officer of the East India Company.

References

External links

1822 births
1887 deaths
People from Kintbury
People educated at Harrow School
Alumni of Christ Church, Oxford
English cricketers
Oxford University cricketers
Members of the Inner Temple
English justices of the peace
High Sheriffs of Berkshire
19th-century English lawyers